Denis Kudla was the defending champion, but did not participate.

Robby Ginepri won the title, defeating Frank Dancevic 6–3, 6–4 in the final.

Seeds

Draw

Finals

Top half

Bottom half

References
 Main Draw
 Qualifying Draw

2014 Singles
2014 ATP Challenger Tour